Sociology of disaster or sociological disaster research is a sub-field of sociology that explores the social relations amongst both natural and human-made disasters. Its scope includes local, national, and global disasters - highlighting these as distinct events that are connected by people through created displacement, trauma, and loss. These connections, whether that is as a survivor, working in disaster management, or as a perpetrator role, is non-discrete and a complex experience that is sought to be understood through this sub-field. Interdisciplinary in nature, the field is closely linked with environmental sociology and sociocultural anthropology.

Overview 
Many studies in the field of sociology of disaster focus on the link between social solidarity and the vulnerabilities exposed by disasters. Scholarship in this field has observed how such events can produce both social solidarity and social conflict, and more importantly, expose inequalities inherent in the social order by exponentially exacerbating its effects. Studies investigating the emotional impact of disaster state that the emotional responses in these contexts are inherently adaptive. These emotions, when reflected on and processed, lead to post traumatic growth, resilience, increased altruism, and engagement with community.

Early disaster research established the mainstream parameters of what it is to do such research - i.e. a focus on solidarity arising in the aftermath of disasters and that disasters are a consequence of human maladaptation to the hazardous environment.

References

Further reading 
 Lars Clausen: "Social Differentiation and the Long-Term Origin of Disasters", Natural Hazards, 1992 (VI), No. 2, p. 181-190, ISSN 0921-030X
 Enrico Quarantelli (ed.): What Is A Disaster? London: Routledge 1998
Fu, Albert S. (2016). "Connecting urban and environmental catastrophe: linking natural disaster, the built environment, and capitalism." Environmental Sociology, 2 (4), 365–374.
Fothergill, A., & Peek, L. A. (2004). Poverty and disasters in the United States: A review of recent sociological findings. Natural hazards, 32(1), 89-110.

Tierney, K. J. (2007). From the margins to the mainstream? Disaster research at the crossroads. Annu. Rev. Sociol., 33, 503–525.

Disaster